Spanish singer Amaia has released two studio albums and twelve singles. She took part in series nine of the reality television talent competition Operación Triunfo, which she won. She also represented Spain at the Eurovision Song Contest 2018, along with Alfred García, with the song "Tu canción". They finished in twenty-third place. She released her debut studio album Pero no pasa nada in September 2019, which includes the singles "El relámpago" and "Quedará en nuestra mente".

Albums

Studio albums

Compilation albums

Singles

As lead artist

As featured artist

Promotional singles

References

Discographies of Spanish artists